Anthrax toxin receptor 2 (ANTXR2 also known as Capillary Morphogenesis Gene 2 or CMG2) is a protein that in humans is encoded by the ANTXR2 gene.

See also
 Anthrax toxin

References

External links

Further reading